The Ingoldsby Legends (full title: The Ingoldsby Legends, or Mirth and Marvels) is a collection of myths, legends, ghost stories and poetry written supposedly by Thomas Ingoldsby of Tappington Manor, actually a pen-name of an English clergyman named Richard Harris Barham.

Background

The legends were first printed during 1837 as a regular series in the magazine Bentley's Miscellany and later in New Monthly Magazine. They proved immensely popular and were compiled into books published in 1840, 1842 and 1847 by Richard Bentley. They remained popular during the 19th century, when they ran through many editions. They were illustrated by artists including John Leech, George Cruikshank, John Tenniel, and Arthur Rackham (1898 edition).

As a priest of the Chapel Royal, with a private income, Barham was not troubled with strenuous duties and he had ample time to read and compose stories. Although based on real legends and mythology, chiefly Kentish, such as the "hand of glory", they are mostly deliberately humorous parodies or pastiches of medieval folklore and poetry.

The best-known poem of the collection is "The Jackdaw of Rheims", about a jackdaw who steals a cardinal's ring, and is made a saint, canonised in the name of Jem Crow. The village pub of Denton was renamed "The Jackdaw Inn" in 1963, after the story. The collection also contains one of the earliest transcriptions of the song "A Franklyn's Dogge", an early version of the modern children's song "Bingo". Barham introduced the collection with the grandiose statement that "The World, according to the best geographers, is divided into Europe, Asia, Africa, America and Romney Marsh".

List of chapters

The chapters include:

Allusions and references in other works 

 In Winston Churchill's The Second World War, when describing the scientific report of the German beams to direct Luftwaffe bombing, given by R. V. Jones of Scientific Intelligence, he quotes from "The Dead Drummer": "now one Mr Jones comes forth and depones…".
 In Patrick Leigh Fermor's A Time of Gifts, Chapter 11 "The Marches of Hungary", p. 312, on seeing a remarkably dressed old Hungarian soldier or official in a coach near the Danube in 1934, complete with brown fur and gold chain around his shoulders, a medal around his neck, and a scimitar across one knee: "('Twould have made you crazy' – the lines suddenly surfaced after years of oblivion – 'to see Esterhazy / with jools from his jasey / to his diamond boots.' Yes, indeed.)" [A jasey is a wig, the word possibly deriving from the garment a jersey.]
 In H. Rider Haggard's 1885 novel King Solomon's Mines, Allan Quatermain describes himself as non-literary, claiming to have read regularly only the Bible and the Ingoldsby Legends. Later in the novel he quotes a poem that he attributes incorrectly to The Ingoldsby Legends, its actual source being Sir Walter Scott's epic poem Marmion.
 In Henry James's 1888 essay "From London", his stay at Morley's Hotel (and the recollection of the four-poster bed) brings to mind "The Ingoldsby Legends", he 'scarce knows why'.
 The narrator in H. G. Wells' short story "The Red Room" (1894) refers to making up rhymes about the legend "Ingoldsby fashion" to calm himself.
 In Sarah Grand's 1897 novel The Beth Book, the narrator and main character, Beth, mentions the Ingoldsby Legends as a favourite of her childhood, and recites a passage from "The Execution" that appears in the collection.
 In J. Meade Falkner's 1903 novel The Nebuly Coat, Lord Blandamar amuses his wife by reading a new edition of the Ingoldsby Legends after dinner.
 In E. Nesbit's The Phoenix and the Carpet (1904), the children consult the Ingoldsby Legends when they want to improvise a magic ritual.
 Rudyard Kipling's short story "The Dog Hervey" (1914), collected in A Diversity of Creatures (1917), references the dog Little Byngo from "A Lay of St Gengulphus".
 In Dorothy L. Sayers's The Nine Tailors, Lord Peter Wimsey quotes from The Ingoldsby Legends, as he also does in her Five Red Herrings.
 In Anthony Powell's 1968 The Military Philosophers, Nick Jenkins mentions reading The Ingoldsby Legends when he needs relaxation from Marcel Proust's In Search of Lost Time.
 In Chapter 7 of Half Magic by Edward Eager, Katherine reads from The Ingoldsby Legends.
 Edmund Wilson references the Ingoldsby Legends in Memoirs of Hecate County when he states that his friend, "staggered in tonight like the jackdaw of Rheims, cursed by bell and book, —". The two main characters then discuss the Ingoldsby Legends.
 Kentish folk band Los Salvadores song "Smugglers' Leap" is based on the story of the same name featured in the Ingoldsby Legends.
 P. G. Wodehouse refers to The Ingoldsby Legends in his novel A Prefect's Uncle (1903), comparing his title character to the lady in the earlier work "who didn't mind death, but who couldn't stand pinching".
 Ngaio Marsh refers to  The Ingoldsby Legends in Death in a White Tie. Troy tells about coming across Lord Tomnoddy and the hanging and the "extraordinary impression" it had on her. She also makes references in Surfeit of Lampreys, the second time (Chapter 19 Part 4) with reference to The Hand of Glory. She also makes brief mention of the work in Death and the Dancing Footman.
 It has been said that the oldest documented usage of the phrase "two shakes of a lamb's tail" can be found within this compilation. Evidences are found within the stories The Babes In The Wood; Or, The Norfolk Tragedy, A Row In An Omnibus (Box): A Legend Of The Haymarket, and The Lay Of St Aloys: A Legend Of Blois.
 In Angela Thirkell's novel Miss Bunting (1946) the Ingoldsby Legends are referred to repeatedly (along with Butler, Byron and W. S. Gilbert) for comic effect as the Mixo-Slavian maid must study them very seriously in her cultural classes as examples of English humour.
 In Dorothy L. Sayers' first Lord Peter Wimsey book, "Whose Body?", the Ingoldsby Legends are referenced: "...or else was spirited away like the lady in the 'Ingoldsby Legends,' body and bones, leaving only a heap of crumpled clothes behind him."

See also

References

External links 

 A Guide to Supernatural Fiction
 The Ingoldsby Legends Online reading and multiple ebook formats at Ex-classics
 The Jackdaw of Rheims

1837 short story collections
1840 short story collections
Horror short story collections
British short story collections
Books illustrated by Arthur Rackham
Books illustrated by George Cruikshank
Books illustrated by John Leech
Books illustrated by John Tenniel
Works originally published in Bentley's Miscellany
Works originally published in The New Monthly Magazine
J. M. Dent books